Associazione Sportiva Dilettantistica Unione Sportiva Scafatese Calcio  was a clone Italian association football club located in Scafati, Campania.

History

Foundation 
The club was founded in 2010 as A.S.D. Virtus Scafatese 2010 and in 2014 it was renamed with the new name.

Serie D 
In the season 2013–14 the team played with the fellow-citizen of S.S. Scafatese Calcio 1922 and was promoted for the first time, from Eccellenza Campania/B to Serie D, but it was immediately relegated. It folded in 2016.

Colors and badge 
Its colors are blue and yellow.

Football clubs in Campania
Serie D clubs
Association football clubs established in 2010
2010 establishments in Italy
2016 disestablishments in Italy